The Roman Catholic Archdiocese of Kingston is a Latin Catholic archdiocese that includes part of the federal Province of Ontario in southeastern Canada.

Its cathedral archiepiscopal see is St. Mary's Cathedral, dedicated to the Immaculate Conception, in Kingston, Ontario.

Ecclesiastical province 
Its suffragan sees are :
 Roman Catholic Diocese of Peterborough, daughter
 Roman Catholic Diocese of Sault Sainte Marie, Ontario.

History 

 Established on 1819.01.12 as Apostolic Vicariate of Upper Canada, on territory split off from the then Roman Catholic Diocese of Québec.
 Promoted as Diocese of Kingston on 27 January 1826, as a suffragan diocese of the (meanwhile promoted) Archdiocese of Quebec. Prior to 1841 when the Diocese of Toronto was created, the diocese included areas that are now part of the Dioceses of Hamilton, London, Saint Catharines, Thunder Bay and Toronto.
 Lost territory repeatedly : on 1841.12.17 to establish Diocese of Toronto, on 1847.06.25 to establish Diocese of Bytown, on 1874.01.25 to establish Apostolic Vicariate of Northern Canada (now suffragan Diocese of Peterborough) and on 1882.07.11 lost territory to the existent Diocese of Peterborough;
 Promoted to Metropolitan Archdiocese of Kingston on 28 December 1889.  
 Lost territory again on 1890.01.21 to establish the Diocese of Alexandria in Ontario.

Statistics 
As per 2014, it pastorally served 123,800 Catholics (36.4% of 340,000 total) on 16,500 km² in 50 parishes with 79 priests (70 diocesan, 9 religious), 29 deacons, 149 lay religious (9 brothers, 140 sisters) and 5 seminarians.

, the archdiocese hads 52 parishes, 79 active diocesan priests, 7 religious priests and 120,000 Catholics, 165 Women Religious, 11 Religious Brothers and 17 permanent deacons.

Bishops
(all Roman Rite)

Bishops of the diocese
Apostolic Vicar of Upper Canada
 Alexander MacDonell (born Scotland, UK) (1819.01.12 – 27 January 1826 see below)  Titular Bishop of Resaina (1819.01.12 – 1826.01.27)

Suffragan Bishops of Kingston :
 Alexander MacDonell (see above 27 January 1826 – death 1840)
 Rémi Gaulin (first Canadian incumbent) (1840.01.14 – death 1857.05.08), succeeding as former Coadjutor Bishop of Kingston (1833.05.10 – 1840.01.14) and  Titular Bishop of Tabraca (1833.05.10 – 1840.01.14), succeeding as former Titular Bishop of Charræ (1843.02.20 – 1857.05.08) and first Auxiliary Bishop of Kingston (1843.02.20 – 1852), then Coadjutor Bishop of Kingston (1852 – 1857.05.08)
 Patrick Phelan (born Ireland) (1857.05.08 – death 1857.06.07)
 Edward John Horan (1858.01.08 – retired 1874.05.28), emeritate as Titular Bishop of Chrysopolis in Arabia (1874.06.16 – died 1875.02.15)
 John O'Brien (1875.02.12 – death 1879.08.01)
 James Vincent Cleary (1880.10.01 – 1889.12.28 see below) (born Ireland)

Metropolitan Archbishops of Kingston :
 James Vincent Cleary (see above 1889.12.28 – death 1898.02.24)
 Charles-Hughes Gauthier (1898.07.29 – 1910.09.06), next Metropolitan Archbishop of Ottawa (Ontario, Canada) (1910.09.06 – death 1922.01.19)
 Michael Joseph Spratt (1911.07.17 – death 1938.02.23)
 Richard Michael Joseph O'Brien (1938.02.23 – death 1943.08.30), previously Bishop of Peterborough (Canada) (1913.06.20 – 1929.05.17), Titular Archbishop of Amorium (1929.05.17 – 1938.02.23) as Coadjutor Archbishop of Kingston (Canada) (1929.05.17 – 1938.02.23)
 Joseph Anthony O'Sullivan (1944.02.26 – 1966.12.14), previously Bishop of Charlottetown (Canada) (1931.02.06 – 1944.02.26); emeritate as Titular Archbishop of Maraguia (1966.12.14 – resigned 1970.11.23), died 1972
 Joseph Lawrence Wilhelm (1966.12.14 – resigned 1982.03.12), died 1995; previously Titular Bishop of Saccæa (1963.06.25 – 1966.12.14) as Auxiliary Bishop of Diocese of Calgary (BC, Canada) (1963.06.25 – 1966.12.14)
 Francis John Spence (1982.04.24 – retired 2002.04.27), also Military Ordinary of Canada (1986.07.21 – 1987.10.28), President of Canadian Conference of Catholic Bishops (1995 – 1997); previously Titular Bishop of Nova (1967.04.01 – 1970.08.17) as Auxiliary Bishop of the Military Vicariate of Canada (1967.04.01 – 1970.08.17), Bishop of Charlottetown (Canada) (1970.08.17 – 1982.03.14), Military Vicar of Canada (Canada) (1982.03.14 – 1986.07.21); died 2011
 Anthony G. Meager (2002.04.27 – death 2007.01.14), previously Titular Bishop of Dura (1997.04.30 – 2002.04.27) as Auxiliary Bishop of Archdiocese of Toronto (Canada) (1997.04.30 – 2002.04.27)
 Brendan Michael O'Brien (1 June 2007 – 2019), previously Titular Bishop of Numana (1987.05.06 – 1993.05.05) as Auxiliary Bishop of Archdiocese of Ottawa (Canada) (1987.05.06 – 1993.05.05), Bishop of Pembroke (Canada) (1993.05.05 – 2000.12.04), Metropolitan Archbishop of St. John’s, Newfoundland (Canada) (2000.12.04 – 2007.06.01), President of Canadian Conference of Catholic Bishops (2003 – 2005).
 Michael Mulhall  (2019.03.28 - ).

Coadjutor bishops
 Thomas Weld (1826-1830), did not succeed to the see; future Cardinal
 John Larkin (1832; did not take effect)
 John Murdoch (1833; did not take effect)
 Rémi Gaulin (1833-1840)
 Patrick Phelan, P.S.S. (1843-1852; apostolic administrator, 1852-1857)
 Michael Joseph O'Brien (1929-1938)

Other priest of this diocese who became Bishop 
 Fergus Patrick McEvay, appointed Bishop of London in 1899

See also 
 List of Catholic dioceses in Canada

References

Sources and external links
 Archdiocese of Kingston — official site
 
 GCatholic, with Google map & satellite photo - data for all sections

Roman Catholic Ecclesiastical Province of Kingston
Organizations based in Kingston, Ontario